This is a list of transfers in Slovenian football for the 2009 summer transfer window. Only moves featuring a PrvaLiga side are listed.

The summer transfer window opened on 1 July 2009 and will close midnight on 1 September 2009. Players without a club may join one at any time, either during or in between transfer windows.

PrvaLiga

Celje

In:

 
 
 

Out:

Domžale

In:

 
 
 
 
 

Out:

Drava

In:

Out:

HIT Gorica

In:

Out:

Interblock

In:

 
 
 
 
 
 
 
 

Out:

Luka Koper

In:

 
 
 
 
 

Out:

Maribor

In:

 
 
 

Out:

Nafta

In:

  
  
   
  
  
  

Out:

Olimpija

In:

 
 
 
 

 
 
 
 
 
 
 
 

Out:

Rudar Velenje

In:

 

 
 

Out:

References

Slovenian
transfers summer 2009
Lists of Slovenian football transfers